La Bussière may refer to the following communes in France:

 La Bussière, Loiret, in the Loiret department
 La Bussière, Vienne, in the Vienne department

See also
 Bussière (disambiguation)
 Bussières (disambiguation)